Sword Records may refer to:

 A budget subsidiary of Word Records operated from 1964 until 1967 to reissue the Word and Canaan albums
 Sword Records, Inc., a currently-operating record label in Tokyo, Japan

American record labels